The 1980 NFL season was the 61st regular season of the National Football League.

Prior to the season in March 1980, fellow NFL owners voted against the proposed move by the Raiders from Oakland, California to Los Angeles. Raiders team owner Al Davis along with the Los Angeles Coliseum sued the NFL charging that they had violated antitrust laws. A verdict in the trial would not be decided until before the 1982 NFL season and thus the 1980 and 1981 Raiders would continue to play in Oakland while awaiting a judgement. 

Meanwhile, the season ended at Super Bowl XV played on January 25, 1981, in New Orleans, Louisiana, with these same Oakland Raiders defeating the Philadelphia Eagles 27–10, making them the first Wild Card team ever to win the Super Bowl.

Oakland Raiders announce future move to Los Angeles in defiance of NFL vote

In 1979, Raiders owner Al Davis announced his intention to move the Raiders to Los Angeles. Negotiations between Davis and the Oakland Coliseum regarding potential improvements to the facility came to an end in February 1980. At the NFL's annual meeting on March 10, 1980, team owners voted 22–0 against allowing the move, with the Raiders not participating and five teams abstaining. Davis announced he would ignore the vote and move the team anyway.

The Raiders played the entire 1980 season in Oakland. At a Monday Night Football game against the Denver Broncos on December 1, 1980, Raider fans protested by entering the Oakland Coliseum five minutes after the start of the game and holding up signs stating "Save Our Raiders" at each half's 2-minute warning. By some estimates, “almost two-thirds” of the Coliseum's seats had been empty at the game's kickoff.

The announced move was involved in four lawsuits: the Los Angeles Coliseum Commission sued the NFL charging antitrust violations, the NFL sued the Raiders charging breach of contract, Raider season ticket holders filed a class-action lawsuit, and the City of Oakland filed for eminent domain of the team.

In May 1982, a jury ruled that the NFL had violated antitrust law by attempting to prevent the move. In April 1983, after the team's first season in Los Angeles, a separate jury awarded the Raiders $35 million in damages.

Draft
The 1980 NFL Draft was held from April 29 to 30, 1980 at New York City's Sheraton Hotel. With the first pick, the Detroit Lions selected running back Billy Sims from the University of Oklahoma.

New referee
The league added a 15th officiating crew, promoting Bob McElwee to referee. The league previously had 15 crews in 1976 (when the league expanded to 28 teams) and 1977. After referee Bernie Ulman retired after the 1977 season, the league used only 14 crews for the 1978 and 1979 seasons, requiring all 14 of them to be on hand for the weekly workload of 14 games.

Major rule changes
A ten-second runoff will be implemented when a team commits the following actions to conserve time within the last minute of either half or overtime (with the half/game/regulation ending automatically if 10 or less seconds remain on the game clock; this was changed to after the two-minute warning in the 2017 NFL season):
Fouls by either team that prevents the snap (e.g. false start, encroachment, etc.)
Intentional grounding 
Illegal forward pass thrown from beyond the line of scrimmage
Throwing a backward pass out of bounds
Spiking or throwing the ball in the field of play after a down has ended, except after a touchdown 
Any other intentional foul that causes the clock to stop.
Any excess time-out taken for injuries by either team.
Teams can take a time-out (if available) to prevent the runoff.
Players are prohibited from striking, swinging, or clubbing to the head, face, or neck. The personal foul could be called whether or not the initial contact was made below the neck.
A "Guidelines for Captains" section was added to the rules.

Records
The New Orleans Saints lost their first 14 games to start the season that matched a record set by the 1976 Tampa Bay Buccaneers

Division Races
From 1978 to 1989, ten teams qualified for the playoffs: the winners of each of the divisions, and two wild-card teams in each conference. These are the leaders for each playoff slot, week by week. Teams listed in Week 16 indicate playoff participants.

National Football Conference

American Football Conference

Regular season

Scheduling formula

Highlights of the 1980 season included:
Thanksgiving: Two games were played on Thursday, November 27, featuring Chicago at Detroit and Seattle at Dallas. Chicago would prevail in overtime, while Dallas, emerged victorious in a 51–7 rout.

Final standings

Tiebreakers
Cleveland finished ahead of Houston in the AFC Central based on better conference record (8–4 to Oilers’ 7–5).
San Diego finished ahead of Oakland in the AFC West based on better net points in division games (plus 60 net points to Raiders’ plus 37).
San Diego was the top AFC playoff seed based on better conference record than Cleveland and Buffalo (9–3 to Browns’ 8–4 and Bills’ 8–4).
Cleveland was the second AFC playoff seed based on better record against common opponents (5–2 to Bills’ 5–3).
Oakland was the first AFC Wild Card based on better conference record than Houston (9–3 to Oilers’ 7–5).
Kansas City finished ahead of Denver in the AFC West based on head-to-head sweep (2–0).
Philadelphia finished ahead of Dallas in the NFC East based on better net points in division games (plus 84 net points to Cowboys’ plus 50).
Atlanta was the top NFC playoff seed based on head-to-head victory over Philadelphia (1–0).
Minnesota finished ahead of Detroit in the NFC Central based on better conference record (8–4 to Lions' 9–5).
Tampa Bay finished ahead of Green Bay in the NFC Central based on better head-to-head record (1–0–1 to Packers' 0–1–1).

Playoffs

Statistical leaders

Team

Awards

Coaching changes

Offseason
Baltimore Colts: Mike McCormack replaced the fired Ted Marchibroda.
Cincinnati Bengals: Forrest Gregg replaced Homer Rice.
St. Louis Cardinals: Jim Hanifan became the Cardinals' new head coach. Bud Wilkinson was fired after the team started the 1979 season at 3–10, and the team's personal director Larry Wilson served as interim for the last three games.

In-season
New Orleans Saints: Dick Nolan was fired after a 0–12 start, with the 12th loss coming on Monday Night Football vs. the division rival Los Angeles Rams. Offensive line coach Dick Stanfel took over as interim.

Stadium changes
The Los Angeles Rams moved from Los Angeles Memorial Coliseum to Anaheim Stadium

Uniform changes
 The Cincinnati Bengals switched from gray to black face masks. The Bengals also added TV numbers to the sleeves of their jerseys, becoming the last NFL team to do so. 
 The Denver Broncos discontinued wearing orange pants with their white jerseys. 
 The Houston Oilers dropped the blue pants worn with their white jerseys for this season only. 
 The Miami Dolphins switched from gray to aqua face masks 
 The Minnesota Vikings switched from gray to white face masks
 The New York Giants reverted to the narrow stripping patterns used prior to 1975

Television
This was the third year under the league's four-year broadcast contracts with ABC, CBS, and NBC to televise Monday Night Football, the NFC package, and the AFC package, respectively. Phyllis George returned to The NFL Today, replacing Jayne Kennedy (who had previously replaced George in 1978).

NBC made history with an announcerless telecast of the December 20, nationally televised Saturday game between the New York Jets and the Miami Dolphins. With both teams out of playoff contention during the last week of the regular season, NBC executive Don Ohlmeyer used this as a one-shot experiment in an attempt to boost ratings.

Deaths

October
October 27- Bill Conkright age 66, Linebacker/Center for the Chicago Bears 1937-1938 and 1944, Cleveland Rams 1939-1942, Brooklyn Dodgers and Washington Redskins 1943, and head coach for the Oakland Raiders in 1962.

December
December 27- Willie Grate, age 35, Tight End for the Buffalo Bills from 1969-1970

Footnotes

References
 NFL Record and Fact Book
 NFL History 1971–1980 (Last accessed December 4, 2005)
 Total Football: The Official Encyclopedia of the National Football League

National Football League seasons
National Football League